Claremont is a passenger rail and bus station in Claremont, California, United States. The Mission Revival-Spanish Colonial Revival style station is listed on the U.S. National Register of Historic Places as Atchison, Topeka and Santa Fe Railroad Station.

History 
Until November 2016, this station was one of the few Metrolink stations that utilized an existing older depot. The depot was built in 1927 by the Atchison, Topeka and Santa Fe Railway in the Spanish Colonial Revival style, and it was placed on the National Register of Historic Places in 1982.  The station was listed in the National Register because of its architecture. The station was renovated at a cost of $2.8 million and reopened for Metrolink use on December 7, 1992. The station was staffed by Foothill Transit and sold bus passes and rail tickets.  On November 20, 2016, the interior of the depot was converted into the new home of the Claremont Museum of Art.

Connecting services
The station is designated as the Claremont TransCenter in Foothill Transit literature, and it serves lines 188, 189, 197, 292, 480, 492, and the 690 Express to Downtown Pasadena. The station is also served by Amtrak California Thruway Motorcoach route 19, with connections to the San Joaquins in Bakersfield. The Foothill Extension, expected to be completed in 2028 as part of the Los Angeles Metro Rail A Line, may share this station.

See also
 List of Registered Historic Places in Los Angeles County, California

References

External links
 
 
 Foothill Transit
 Amtrak California

Claremont, California
Metrolink stations in Los Angeles County, California
Amtrak Thruway Motorcoach stations in Los Angeles County, California
Former Atchison, Topeka and Santa Fe Railway stations in California
Buildings and structures on the National Register of Historic Places in Los Angeles County, California
Railway stations on the National Register of Historic Places in California
Railway stations in the United States opened in 1927
Railway stations in the United States opened in 1992
Mission Revival architecture in California
Spanish Colonial Revival architecture in California
Bus stations in Los Angeles County, California
1927 establishments in California
1992 establishments in California
Future Los Angeles Metro Rail stations
Pacific Electric stations